Wayne Eyer Manning (December 4, 1899 – February 8, 2004) was an American horticulturist and botanist.

Biography 
In 1920, Manning obtained his Bachelor of Sciences from Oberlin College. In 1926 he received his Ph.D. from Cornell University. His dissertation research was based on the study of the floral anatomy of Juglandaceae.

Manning was a professor at Cornell for one year and then began teaching at the University of Illinois at Urbana–Champaign. He then became a professor at Smith College where he taught from 1928 until 1941. In 1945, he began teaching at Bucknell University. He remained at this university until his retirement in 1968.

He published more than 40 publications mainly on the subject of Juglandaceae.

Some publications 

 1926. The Morphology and Anatomy of the Flowers of the Juglandaceae. Ed. Cornell Univ. 264 pp.

Honors

Eponimia 
 Species
 (Juglandaceae) Alfaroa manningii León

References 

1899 births
2004 deaths
American botanists
American centenarians
American horticulturists
Botanists with author abbreviations
Cornell University alumni
Cornell University faculty
Men centenarians
Ohio University alumni
University of Illinois Urbana-Champaign faculty
Oberlin College alumni